Three Japanese destroyers have been named Ayanami:

 , lead ship of the s 

Imperial Japanese Navy ship names
Japanese Navy ship names